Makrand Jadhav - Patil is a leader of Nationalist Congress Party and a member of the Maharashtra Legislative Assembly elected from Wai Assembly constituency in Satara city.

Positions held
 2019: Elected to Maharashtra Legislative Assembly.

References

Living people
Members of the Maharashtra Legislative Assembly
Nationalist Congress Party politicians from Maharashtra
People from Satara district

Year of birth missing (living people)